Matvey Sergeyevich Zubov (born 22 January 1991) is a Russian cyclist.

Major results

2009
 UCI Juniors Track World Championships
1st  Team pursuit (with Konstantin Kuperasov, Viktor Manakov and Ivan Savitskiy)
3rd  Points race
 1st  Team pursuit, UEC European Junior Track Championships (with Konstantin Kuperasov, Viktor Manakov and Ivan Savitskiy)
 1st Stage 2 Course de la Paix Juniors
 10th Time trial, UCI Juniors World Championships
2011
 2nd Road race, National Under-23 Road Championships
2012
 1st  Team pursuit, UEC European Under-23 Track Championships (with Nikolay Zhurkin, Ivan Savitskiy and Viktor Manakov)
2013
 10th Overall Five Rings of Moscow
2014
 5th Memorial Oleg Dyachenko
 8th Overall Baltic Chain Tour
 9th Overall Grand Prix of Sochi
2015
 1st Stage 4 Five Rings of Moscow
2017
 1st Stage 2 Five Rings of Moscow

References

External links

1991 births
Living people
Russian male cyclists